Faraj Laheeb (born October 3, 1978 in Kuwait) is a retired Kuwaiti football player.

He played for Al-Kuwait in the 2007 AFC Champions League group stage.

References

External links
 

1978 births
Living people
Kuwaiti footballers
Kuwaiti expatriate footballers
Kuwait international footballers
Olympic footballers of Kuwait
Footballers at the 2000 Summer Olympics
Asian Games medalists in football
Footballers at the 1998 Asian Games
Saudi Professional League players
Ettifaq FC players
Asian Games silver medalists for Kuwait
Association football forwards
Medalists at the 1998 Asian Games
Expatriate footballers in Saudi Arabia
Kuwaiti expatriate sportspeople in Saudi Arabia
Al-Yarmouk SC (Kuwait) players
Al Salmiya SC players
Kuwait Premier League players
Kazma SC players
Kuwait SC players